Babingtonia triandra, commonly known as triplet babingtonia, is a shrub endemic to Western Australia.

It is found in a small area in the Wheatbelt region of Western Australia near Victoria Plains.

References

Eudicots of Western Australia
triandra
Endemic flora of Western Australia
Plants described in 2015
Taxa named by Barbara Lynette Rye
Taxa named by Malcolm Eric Trudgen